Charley James Price (16 March 1890 – 7 June 1967) was an English cricketer who played for Gloucestershire. He was born in South Hamlet, Gloucester, and died in High Orchard, also in Gloucester.

Price made a single first-class appearance for the team, during the 1919 season, against Leicestershire. From the upper-middle order, he scored 6 runs in the first innings in which he batted, and 13 runs in the second.

External links
Charley Price at Cricket Archive 

1890 births
1967 deaths
English cricketers
Gloucestershire cricketers
Cricketers from Gloucester